Sam S. Reed (born January 10, 1941) is an American accountant and politician who served as the 14th Secretary of State of Washington from 2001 to 2013 and is a member of the Republican Party. Reed was Washington's fourteenth Secretary of State. He opted not to run for a fourth term, and retired in January 2013.

Reed received his bachelor's and master's degrees in political science from Washington State University.  He was elected to the office of Secretary of State in 2000, as one of only two Republicans to be elected to statewide office that year, after serving as Thurston County auditor.

Early life
Reed, whose family lived in Washington in territorial days, grew up in Wenatchee. His family later moved to Spokane, where Reed graduated from Lewis and Clark High School. He attended Washington State University, where he earned a bachelor's degree in social studies and master's degree in political science. In 1969 he started the Cascade Conference, which ultimately evolved into the Mainstream Republicans of Washington.

Career
Reed was first elected as Washington's Secretary of State in 2000. Reed supported an initiative approved by Washington voters in 2004 that created a "Top 2 Primary" in which voters can choose any candidate on the primary ballot, regardless of political party. After political parties filed a lawsuit against the new primary system, Reed and State Attorney General Rob McKenna took the case to the U.S. Supreme Court, which ruled in favor of the Top 2 system in March 2008. In 2004, he launched the nation's first state government digital archives to rescue disappearing electronic history. Following Washington's controversial gubernatorial race in 2004 (the closest such contest in U.S. history), Reed successfully pushed for several improvements to the state's voting process.

Prior to his service as Secretary of State, Reed was elected Thurston County Auditor five times and served as Washington's Assistant Secretary of State under Lud Kramer and Bruce Chapman. Reed is past president of the National Association of Secretaries of State (NASS). He also served as an advisor to the U.S. Election Assistance Commission from 2005 to 2007. Reed is a member of the Olympia Kiwanis Club and sits on the Washington State Historical Society Board of Trustees, TVW's Board of Directors, the YMCA Youth & Government Board, and the State Capitol Committee.

2004 election
In 2004 Reed was re-elected by a relatively comfortable margin of about 6 percent. His opponents were Laura Ruderman, a state legislator, and Jacqueline Passey, a college student.

As Secretary of State, Reed oversaw the controversial 2004 Washington gubernatorial election between Dino Rossi and Christine Gregoire. He also advocated for, and oversaw the introduction of, Washington's nonpartisan blanket primary voting system for statewide and state legislative district elections.

2008 election

In November 2008 Sam Reed ran for re-election against Democrat Jason Osgood and won with more than 58 percent of the vote statewide.

Personal life
Reed and his wife Margie make their home in Olympia. They have two adult children, David and Kristen, and two grandchildren.

External links
 Washington Secretary of State Homepage
 Sam Reed's Campaign Website
 

County officials in Washington (state)
American accountants
Living people
People from Olympia, Washington
People from Wenatchee, Washington
Secretaries of State of Washington (state)
Washington (state) Republicans
Washington State University alumni
1941 births